Evan Roderick Anderson (born 29 June 1995) is a Canadian actor and former ice hockey player.

Life and career
Roderick was born and raised in North Vancouver, British Columbia. He has an older brother, Stuart. Evan first became interested in performing arts when he saw a Rolling Stones concert at the age of 10, and he decided to pursue it as a teenager.

Roderick attended Okanagan Hockey Academy in Penticton. He began ice hockey in the Pacific Coast Bantam Hockey League, BC Hockey Major Midget League, and Canadian Sport School Hockey League. He went on to play in the British Columbia Hockey League: one season with the Westside Warriors, one with the Alberni Valley Bulldogs, and three with the Langley Rivermen. He also played a season each in the Kootenay International Junior Hockey League with the Penticton Lakers and in the Pacific Junior Hockey League with the North Delta Devils. He acquired a division 1 scholarship to play for the University of Massachusetts Lowell River Hawks in the NCAA. He quit the sport at 19 after a series of injuries.

Roderick began working in commercials and short films from 2015. He made his television debut with a guest role in a 2015 episode of the docudrama series Untold Stories of the E.R., followed by Project Mc2 and When We Rise in 2017, Garage Sale Mystery in 2018, and BH90210 in 2019. He landed his first major role as Officer Nick Anastas in the DC Comics series Arrow, a recurring role he played for the last three seasons of the show from 2017 to 2019. In December 2018, it was announced Roderick would star as Justin Davis opposite Kaya Scodelario in the 2020 Netflix series Spinning Out.

Filmography

Filmmaking credits
Young/Old/Man (2017) - produced

Film

Television

References

External links

Living people
1995 births
21st-century Canadian male actors
Alberni Valley Bulldogs players
Canadian male television actors
Canadian people of British descent
Ice hockey people from British Columbia
Langley Rivermen players
Male actors from British Columbia
People from North Vancouver
UMass Lowell River Hawks men's ice hockey players